Superjet may refer to:

 Either of two jets manufactured by Sukhoi Company of Russia:
 Sukhoi Superjet 100
 Sukhoi Superjet 130
 SuperJet International, an Italy-based venture between Alenia Aermacchi and Sukhoi Holding 
 Superjet Lines, an Egyptian bus line operating in a number of Arab countries
 Yamaha SuperJet, a personal watercraft made by Yamaha Motor Corporation